Frédéric Vervisch (born 10 August 1986 in Kortrijk) is a Belgian racing driver who currently races in the GT World Challenge Europe.

Career

Early career
A winner of numerous karting championships, Vervisch moved to auto racing in 2003 making a single start in the Formula Three French Cup and immediately won upon his debut. Following that initial success, he participated in the entire 2004 Formula Three French Cup championship and finished runner-up.

Formula Renault
In 2005 Vervisch moved to the Formula Renault 3.5 series, participating with GD Racing in 4 rounds with a best result of 12th in Zolder in a race won by Robert Kubica. The season ended after round 4 in Le Mans when it became clear that his sponsor Kizz-Me was not fulfilling its financial obligations, a fraud that the same company committed again against a WRC driver and his team in 2006.

In 2006 the 19-year-old Vervisch took a step back and competed full-time in Formula Renault 2.0 Northern European Cup with SL Formula Racing, finishing 9th in points and scoring a season-best 5th place at the Anderstorp round.

Formula Three
In 2007 Vervisch graduated to F3 and raced with JB Motorsport in the German F3 Championship. He made a remarkable debut and finished runner-up to Carlo van Dam with 4 race wins and 11 podium finishes.

That winter, lured by the F1 test with Force India as prize for the champion, Vervisch participated with Team Goddard in the Asian F3 Championship with only one goal: winning the championship. He did so while scoring an overwhelming 11 race wins on circuits such as Sepang and Zhuhai. However, due to changes in F1 testing rules, the F1 test drive with Force India could not take place.

In 2008 Vervisch returned to the German F3 Championship, this time with Swiss Racing Team. Again, the goal was clear and simple: winning the championship. Halfway the season Vervisch switched to Jo Zeller Racing and eventually clinched the title by winning 5 of the 6 remaining races, which brought his total season tally to 7 race wins.

In 2010 Vervisch decided to go back to Europe and race with RC Motorsport in the Italian F3 Championship. He scored a season-best 3rd-place finish at Imola but left the championship at the next round in Mugello after having suffered 2 engine failures before even the start of the first race, and the subsequent team decision to withdraw from the race.

Atlantic Championship
In 2009 after having won the 2008 German F3 title, Vervisch moved to the United States where he competed in the Atlantic Championship for Genoa Racing. He finished 4th in the championship standings with four podium finishes and grabbed the Rookie of the Year title.

Superleague Formula
On 5 September 2010, Vervisch made his debut in Superleague Formula after receiving an invitation by Atech-Reid to drive the Liverpool FC car at the Adria round. In the race, he overtook his teammate Yelmer Buurman and Robert Doornbos, and secured a slot in the Super Final. Vervisch continued his successful series debut at the next round in Portimão where he was crowned the overall weekend winner in the Super Final. He took his pace to the inaugural Superleague Formula China rounds in Ordos where he first suffered an engine failure in race 1 but then recovered with a victory in race 2 and in the streets of Beijing where Vervisch scored a double podium finish – in race 1 and then the overall 3rd spot for the weekend. At the final round of the Superleague Formula season in Navarra Vervisch didn't reach the finish line due to mechanical failures in both races.

Veranstaltergemeinschaft Langstreckenmeisterschaft Nürburgring (VLN) 
On 20-23 June 2019, Verschisch took one of the biggest victories in his career by winning the 24 hours of the Nürburgring, part of the VLN championship, driving for Phoenix Racing in the Audi R8 LMS (GT3) with teammates Dries Vanthoor (BEL), Pierre Kaffer (CH) and Frank Stippler (DEU).

Racing record

Career summary

‡ Team standings
† As Vervisch was a guest driver, he was ineligible to score points.
* Season still in progress.

Complete Formula Renault 3.5 Series results
(key) (Races in bold indicate pole position) (Races in italics indicate fastest lap)

Atlantic Championship results
(key) (Races in bold indicate pole position) (Races in italics indicate fastest lap)

† Vervisch finished the season as Rookie of the Year

Superleague Formula results
(key) (Races in bold indicate pole position) (Races in italics indicate fastest lap)

NOTE – R2 starts
with reverse grid
S = Super Final
† The Super Final at the Beijing round was cancelled but Vervisch was classified as 3rd overall

Complete GT World Challenge Europe Sprint Cup results

Complete TCR International Series results
(key) (Races in bold indicate pole position) (Races in italics indicate fastest lap)

† Driver did not finish the race, but was classified as he completed over 90% of the race distance.

Complete World Touring Car Cup results
(key) (Races in bold indicate pole position) (Races in italics indicate fastest lap)

Complete IMSA SportsCar Championship results
(key) (Races in bold indicate pole position; results in italics indicate fastest lap)

Complete TCR Europe Touring Car Series results
(key) (Races in bold indicate pole position) (Races in italics indicate fastest lap)

References

External links
 
 

1986 births
Living people
Belgian racing drivers
Formula Renault 2.0 NEC drivers
Formula Renault Eurocup drivers
Asian Formula Three Championship drivers
German Formula Three Championship drivers
Formula 3 Euro Series drivers
Atlantic Championship drivers
Italian Formula Three Championship drivers
World Series Formula V8 3.5 drivers
Blancpain Endurance Series drivers
24 Hours of Spa drivers
Stock Car Brasil drivers
Sportspeople from Kortrijk
Superleague Formula drivers
24 Hours of Daytona drivers
24H Series drivers
ADAC GT Masters drivers
European Le Mans Series drivers
Asian Le Mans Series drivers
TCR International Series drivers
World Touring Car Cup drivers
Audi Sport drivers
Jo Zeller Racing drivers
RC Motorsport drivers
W Racing Team drivers
ISR Racing drivers
AF Corse drivers
Phoenix Racing drivers
Mücke Motorsport drivers
Eurasia Motorsport drivers
Nürburgring 24 Hours drivers
Chinese F4 Championship drivers
Saintéloc Racing drivers
Comtoyou Racing drivers
Boutsen Ginion Racing drivers
Le Mans Cup drivers
TCR Europe Touring Car Series drivers